The Lynchburg Metropolitan Statistical Area is a United States Metropolitan Statistical Area (MSA) in the state of Virginia, as defined by the Office of Management and Budget (OMB) as of June 2003. As of the 2000 census, the MSA had a population of 228,616. In 2009 this was estimated to have risen to 247,447; as of 2016, the Lynchburg MSA was estimated to have a population of 260,320, making it the fifth-largest metro area in the state.

MSA components
Note: Since a state constitutional change in 1871, places in Virginia incorporated as a "city" are independent cities and are not located in any county. The OMB considers these independent cities to be county-equivalents for the purpose of defining MSAs in Virginia.

Four counties and one independent city are included in the Lynchburg Metropolitan Statistical Area.

Counties
Amherst
Appomattox
Bedford 
Campbell
Independent Cities
Lynchburg

Communities

Places with more than 65,000 inhabitants
Lynchburg (Principal city)

Places with 10,000 to 15,000 inhabitants
Forest (census-designated place)
Madison Heights (census-designated place)
Timberlake (census-designated place)

Places with 1,000 to 10,000 inhabitants
Altavista
Amherst
Appomattox
Bedford
Brookneal
Rustburg (census-designated place)

Places with less than 1,000 inhabitants
Pamplin City (partial)

Unincorporated places

Demographics
As of the census of 2000, there were 228,616 people, 89,736 households, and 62,698 families residing within the MSA. The racial makeup of the MSA was 79.42% White, 18.16% African American, 0.30% Native American, 0.69% Asian, 0.02% Pacific Islander, 0.39% from other races, and 1.01% from two or more races. Hispanic or Latino of any race were 0.95% of the population.

The median income for a household in the MSA was $35,890, and the median income for a family was $42,085. Males had a median income of $31,701 versus $21,702 for females. The per capita income for the MSA was $18,073.

See also
List of U.S. Metropolitan Statistical Areas in Virginia
Virginia census statistical areas

References

 
Amherst County, Virginia
Appomattox County, Virginia
Bedford County, Virginia
Campbell County, Virginia
Lynchburg, Virginia
Bedford, Virginia
1782 establishments in Virginia
Populated places established in 1782